Abdullah Ahmed Khalfan Mesfer (born 28 January 1962) is an Emirati professional football manager.

Career
In 2000 and from 2011 to 2012 he coached United Arab Emirates national football team. Later he trained the Dibba Al-Fujairah and Al Dhafra SCC. Since 2014 he led the United Arab Emirates U19

References

External links

Profile at Soccerpunter.com

1962 births
Living people
Emirati football managers
Jordan national football team managers
UAE Pro League managers
Baniyas SC managers
Al Bataeh Club managers
Place of birth missing (living people)

United Arab Emirates national football team managers